First Presbyterian Church of Atlanta is a congregation of the Presbyterian Church (U.S.A.) located in the Midtown section of Atlanta, Georgia. First Presbyterian Church was founded in 1848, and it was Atlanta's first Presbyterian house of worship. The original church building on Marietta Street was vacated in April 1916 and the property was sold to the U.S. government for the construction of the headquarters of the Federal Reserve Bank of Atlanta.  The current church building on Peachtree Street was listed on the National Register of Historic Places in 2020.

The church, which hosts a congregation of 2,000 members, is located across 16th Street from the High Museum of Art.

First Presbyterian Church of Atlanta's History 
When the church was founded on January 8, 1848 there were only nineteen Presbyterians worshiping at the log building known as the male academy. "This church was incorporated in February, 1854." "The name under which it was first incorporated was the 'First Presbyterian Church of Atlanta,' and it was the only Presbyterian church in the city." The founding pastor of First Presbyterian Church was Dr. John S. Wilson.  In 1915 the church completed a Sunday School building at the new location where the first service was held on December 5, 1915.  The new sanctuary, which was designed by Walter T. Downing (1865-1918), was completed in 1919. The first stained glass windows, some by Tiffany, were installed then and over the next few years.

First Presbyterian Sunday morning worship service was broadcast on local WSB (AM) radio.  The only time the service on the radio was suspended was September 3, 1939, when the United Kingdom declared war on Germany and brought the world to the brink of World War II.  In 1973, the church received its first black member since the days of slavery.  Now the church is led by Dr. Tony Sundermeier who became pastor in 2014.

Purpose 
"It is our purpose as a congregation of the Presbyterian Church (U.S.A.), 
to be and become 
a community of grace
a people of praise
a loving congregation
rooted in tradition, open to the Spirit
disciples who proclaim and serve
the Lord Jesus Christ 
in all we say and do
to the glory of God
for the salvation of humankind
for the healing and hope of the city, and
for the reconciliation and peace of the world."

Organ 

After finishing the church in 1919 the first organ was constructed by Henry Pilcher's Sons in 1919 with 4 manuals. In 1920 the Echo- and Solo-sections were added, and the organ had 48 stops. In 1969 organ builder M. P. Möller (Hagerstown/MD) built a completely new organ, using some stops from the Pilcher's organ from 1919. In 1992 the instrument was restored and enlarged. In 2018 the instrument again was cleaned and restored and newly enlarged by German organ builder Klais (Bonn) and US organ builder A. E. Schlueter. The Instrument has 112 ranks (6.397 pipes) on 10 divisions, with a control system by Syndyne.

Main Organ (Chancel)

Gallery Organ 

 Couplers
 8'-Couplers: CH/GT, POS/GT, CH/SW, POS/SW, CH/SOLO, POS/SOLO, GT/CH, GT/POS, SW/CH, SW/POS, SW/GT, SOLO/CH, SOLO/POS, SOLO/GT, SOLO/SW; GT(Gal)/CH, GT(Gal)/POS, GT(Gal)/GT, GT(Gal)/SW, GT(Gal)/SOLO, SW(Gal)/CH, SW(Gal)/POS, SW(Gal)/GT, SW(Gal)/SW, SW(Gal)/SOLO, ECHO(Gal)/GT, ECHO(Gal)/CH, ECHO(Gal)/POS, ECHO(Gal)/SW, ECHO(Gal)/SOLO; CH/Ped, POS/Ped, GT/Ped, SW/Ped, SOLO/Ped; GT(Gal)/Ped, SW(Gal)/Ped, ECHO(Gal)/Ped
 16'-Couplers: CH/GT, POS/GT, SW/CH, SW/POS, SW/GT, SOLO/CH, SOLO/POS, SOLO/GT; GT(Gal)/GT, SW(Gal)/GT, ECHO(Gal)/GT; GT(Gal)/GT(Gal), SW(Gal)/SW(Gal), ECHO(Gal)/ECHO(Gal)
 4'-Couplers: <small>CH/GT, POS/GT, SW/CH, SW/POS, SW/GT, SOLO/CH, SOLO/POS, SOLO/GT; GT(Gal)/GT, SW(Gal)/GT, ECHO(Gal)/GT; GT(Gal)/GT(Gal), SW(Gal)/SW(Gal), ECHO(Gal)/ECHO(Gal); CH/Ped, POS/Ped, GT/Ped, SW/Ped, SOLO/Ped; GT(Gal)/Ped, SW(Gal)/Ped, ECHO(Gal)/Ped
 ORCHESTRAL-Couplers: ORCH/I, ORCH/II, ORCH/III, ORCH/IV, ORCH/PED 
 Effect stops: Zimbelstern, Tower Bells
 Special Features
 Full record playback on Touch Screen
 Programmable Crescendo, 4 different per user
 Up to 50 users with 100 levels of memory each
 2 blank pistons that allow programming non standard coupling at any pitch
 Sostenuto
 All Swells to Swell
 Registerfessel
 Pedal Divide (Settable Divide, default C13)
 French Manual Transfer

References

External links
First Presbyterian Church of Atlanta web site

Presbyterian churches in Atlanta
Midtown Atlanta
National Register of Historic Places in Fulton County, Georgia